Science and technology in Botswana examines recent trends and developments in science, technology and innovation policy in this country. The Republic of Botswana was one of the first countries of the Southern African Development Community (SADC) to adopt a science and technology policy in 1998. This was later updated in 2011.

Socio-economic context 
The Republic of Botswana has one of the longest post-independence histories of political stability in Africa. A multiparty democracy, it is deemed the continent's best-performing country by the Corruption Perceptions Index (31st out of 175) and ranked third in 2014 in the Ibrahim Index of African Governance.

At the time of independence in 1966, Botswana was one of the poorest countries in the world. A year later, diamonds were discovered and have since become a pillar of the economy. Today, Botswana has one of the highest levels of income in Africa. Between 2009 and 2013, GDP per capita rose from $12,404 to $15,247 (in purchasing power parity dollars, 2011 constant prices), boosted by the global commodity boom. This corresponds to a leap of 23% in GDP per capita over this period. Within the SADC region, only the Seychelles and Mauritius have higher levels of average income. In 2013, GDP progressed by 5.8% in Botswana.

Although real GDP per capita is relatively high and growing, the country ranks second in the SADC for inequality and there is widespread poverty. The unemployment rate stood at 18% in 2013. Botswana's incidence of HIV (18.5% of the population) is also among the highest in the world, according to the Botswana AIDS Impact Survey of 2013.

The African continent plans to create an African Economic Community by 2028, which would be built on the main regional economic communities, including the Southern African Development Community, to which Botswana belongs.

Economic diversification a priority 
As of 2015, Botswana is the world's top producer of diamonds, in terms of value. Despite being heavily reliant on the mining sector, Botswana has escaped the ‘resource curse’ to a large extent by delinking public expenditure and revenue from the mining sector. This revenue is invested in a savings fund to enable an anti-cyclical fiscal policy. Revenue from diamonds has been invested in public goods and infrastructure and the government has long established universal scholarship schemes which fully subsidize education at all levels.

Even before the slump in international demand during the global financial crisis of 2008–2009, diamond mining had been contributing less to economic growth with each plan period. This led the government to make diversifying the economy a priority of the Tenth National Development Plan for the period 2009–2016. The government considers private-sector participation as being ‘critical’ to the Tenth Plan’s success and enhancing the role of research and development (R&D) as being the most effective way of fuelling entrepreneurship and private-sector growth. In 2010, the government published its Economic Diversification Drive. In 2011, it revised the Companies Act to allow applicants to register their company without the involvement of company secretaries, thereby reducing business start-up costs. The government has also introduced a points-based system to allow skilled expatriates to work in Botswana.

Diversification is also one of the priorities of the Eleventh National Development Plan for the period 2017–2023, along with developing human capital, promoting social development and the sustainable use of natural resources, good governance and national security. This plan has been guided by Vision 2036 (2016), Botswana’s blueprint for achieving high-income status by 2036.

To diversify the economy, Botswana is focusing on areas of comparative advantage, among which feature financial services, education and health, alongside diamonds, beef, tourism and mining. Special economic zones are to be developed around Sir Seretse Khama International Airport and in the Padamatenga area, to attract investment.

Development of six innovation hubs 
The centrepiece of the government's economic diversification strategy is the development of six innovation hubs. The first of these was established in 2008 to foster the commercialization and diversification of agriculture. The second to be set up was the Botswana Diamond Hub. Until recently, rough diamonds accounted for 70% of Botswana's exports. After these exports contracted during the global financial crisis of 2008–2009, the government decided to derive greater benefits from its diamond industry by renegotiating agreements with multinational companies like De Beers in 2011 and setting up a Diamond Technology Park in Gaborone in 2009 as a hub for the local cutting and polishing of diamonds, as well as the manufacture of diamond jewellery. By 2012, the government had licensed 16 diamond polishing and cutting companies.

The Botswana Innovation Hub, established in 2012, is Botswana’s flagship hub. By the end of 2012, its governing bodies had approved and registered 17 entities to operate in the park. These included academic institutions like the University of Botswana and companies active in such diverse areas as custom design and the manufacture of drilling rigs, specialized mining exploration technologies, diamond jewellery design and manufacturing, as well as ICT applications and software. By 2013, basic services had been installed on the 57-acre plot in Gaborone, such as water mains and electricity, and the site was ready for intensive development.

The Information and Technology Division of the Botswana Innovation Hub hosts the Technology Entrepreneurship Programme, which offers support through pre-incubation, incubation and acceleration stages. The hub’s five priority focal areas are mining technology, biotechnology, cleantech, ICTs and indigenous knowledge. Over 2017–2018, the hub supported more than 100 start-ups.

In 2018, the hub launched the Botswana Innovation Fund. Its first call for proposals led to the allocation of BWP 5.6 million (about US$500 000) in funding to seven projects. Among these was the Intelligent Traffic Management System, a smart system that adjusts traffic light periods based on live traffic flow.

In addition, an education hub has been approved by the Government Implementation Co-ordinating Office, with the objective of developing quality education and research training to make Botswana a regional centre of excellence and promote economic diversification and sustainable growth. High unemployment (18.4% in 2013) has been linked to the mismatch between skills development and market needs, together with slow private-sector growth. The Botswana Education Hub will be co-ordinating its activities with those of the other five hubs in agriculture, innovation, transport, diamonds and health.

Science, technology and innovation

Status of national innovation system 
Botswana is considered as having an evolving national innovation system. Botswana was ranked 106th in the Global Innovation Index in 2021, down from 93rd in 2019.

Status of national innovation systems in the Southern Africa Development Community, 2015

Source of table: Mbula-Kraemer, Erika and Scerri, Mario (2015) Southern Africa. In: UNESCO Science Report: towards 2030. UNESCO, Paris, Table 20.5.

Revision of national science policy 
In 2008, the Minister of Communication, Science and Technology requested UNESCO's assistance in reviewing the country's first Science and Technology Policy,  which dated from 1998. Botswana published its updated National Policy on Research, Science and Technology in 2011, within a UNESCO project sponsored by the Spanish Agency for International Cooperation and Development (AECID).

Botswana's Science and Technology Policy can be credited with a number of achievements but it is generally considered as having failed to overcome many of the problems it sought to address, including insufficient investment in research and development and insufficient job and wealth creation. The government is determined to ensure that the revised policy, published in 2011, remedies the shortfalls of its predecessor.

The National Policy on Research, Science, Technology and Innovation (2011) has been consolidated with the 2005 Botswana Research, Science and Technology Plan (2005), following the recommendations of the review conducted by UNESCO in 2009. The policy aims to take up the challenges of rapid technological evolution, globalization and the achievement of the national development goals formulated in high-level strategic documents that include Botswana's Tenth National Development Plan to 2016 and Vision 2016.

The National Policy on Research, Science, Technology and Innovation (2011) is accompanied by an implementation plan that was adopted in 2012.

The National Policy on Research, Science, Technology and Innovation  has four main thrusts:
 Development of a co-ordinated and integrated approach to science, technology and innovation (STI) planning and implementation;
 Development of STI indicators, in accordance with the guidelines of the Frascati Manual and Oslo Manual of the Organisation for Economic Cooperation and Development;
 The launch of regular participatory foresight exercises; and
 The strengthening of institutional structures responsible for policy monitoring and implementation.

In 2013, the Minister of Education and Skills of Botswana, the Honourable Dr Pelonomi Venson-Moitoi, highlighted some of the challenges facing her country at the launch of a UNESCO study of Botswana's national innovation system. She cited the need to improve both intellectual property protection and the commercialization of products derived from R&D. She also evoked the funding dilemma for a developing country like Botswana, where the decision to invest in R&D has to be weighed against the need, for example, to build a clinic for people afflicted with HIV and AIDS.

The Botswana Academy of Sciences was launched in November 2015. Pending an updated version of the National Policy on Research, Science, Technology and Innovation (2011), the Eleventh National Development Plan commits to raising investment in research, which is to be oriented towards economic and industrial needs in the following priority sectors: health; services; ecotourism; software development; agriculture; and manufacturing.

Higher education 
In 2014, Botswana had two public and seven private universities. The University of Botswana is primarily a teaching institution, whereas the Botswana International University of Science and Technology, which welcomed its first 267 students in September 2012, is a research university that plans to raise the academic qualifications of staff.

In the Eleventh National Development Plan, the government recommits to implementing the Education and Training Sector Strategic Plan for 2015–2020. This plan sets out a transformational agenda to revise curricula at all levels of education, augment the use of ICTs and match training to industrial needs. It is proposed to introduce multiple pathways at the upper secondary level, to allow students to choose between vocational skills, social sciences, basic sciences and business studies.

Among SADC countries, Botswana committed the second-largest share of GDP to expenditure on education (9.5%) after Lesotho (13.0%) in 2009. Botswana also devoted the largest share of GDP to expenditure on higher education (3.9%) after Lesotho (4.7%). Between 2006 and 2011, the number of students enrolled in higher education rose from 22,257 to 39,894 (post-secondary non-degree, bachelor's, master's and PhD programmes combined).

The Botswana International University of Science and Technology (established in 2012) was fully operational by the 2014/2015 academic year. According to the university’s annual report, there were 1 881 students enrolled in 2018/2019, 33% of whom were women. In the same year, the university’s research focus areas included:

 remote sensing of natural resources and the environment;
 sustainable energy and resource beneficiation;
 solar energy materials;
 applied nuclear sciences and technology;
 transformation enabled by information technology;
 bioinformatics, data science and high performance
 computing; and
 artificial intelligence and smart systems.

Under the EU-funded Pan-African Planetary and Space Science Network, the university has received a grant of €1.4 million to ready young scientists for projects like the Square Kilometre Array.

Investment in research and development

Financial investment 

Botswana devoted 0.26% of GDP to R&D in 2012. Three-quarters of this investment came from the government (74%), 6% from the business enterprise sector and 7% from abroad. The National Policy on Research, Science, Technology and Innovation (2011)  fixes the target of raising gross domestic expenditure on research and development (GERD) to over 2% of GDP by 2016. This target can only be reached within the specified time frame by raising public spending on R&D.

The spending on research and development as a share of GDP rose to 0.54% in 2013, the most recent year with data as of 2021. Pending an updated version of the National Policy on Research, Science, Technology and Innovation (2011), the National Development Plan commits to raising investment
in research, which is to be oriented towards economic and industrial needs in the following priority sectors: health; services; ecotourism; software development; agriculture; and manufacturing.

Human investment 
Despite the modest level of financial investment, Botswana counts one of the highest researcher densities in sub-Saharan Africa: 344 per million inhabitants (in head counts), compared to 200 in Zimbabwe, 343 in Namibia, 350 in Gabon, 631 in Senegal and 818 in South Africa. The average for sub-Saharan Africa was 91 researchers per million inhabitants in 2013.

Consequently, the ratio of research funding to population is fairly low in Botswana: $37.8 per capita and $110,000 per researcher (in current purchasing parity).
One in four Botswanan researchers (27%) was a woman in 2012, the same ratio as in Angola. This is a slightly higher ratio than for the United Republic of Tanzania and Zimbabwe (25%) but it is considerably lower than in Namibia and South Africa (44%). The average for sub-Saharan Africa is 30%.

By 2013, women researchers in Botswana had almost obtained parity in medical sciences, accounting for 44% of researchers in this field. More than one in four women researchers were working in the field of natural sciences (28%) and more than one in three in social sciences and humanities (38%). Women researchers remained rare in engineering, however (8%).

Trends in scientific publishing 

The number of publications by Botswanan scientists catalogued in international databases increased from 133 to 210 between 2009 and 2014, according to Thomson Reuters' Web of Science (Science Citation Index). In 2018, there were 281 scientific and technical journal articles which originated from Botswana. Today, it has one of the highest levels of scientific productivity per capita in sub-Saharan Africa (103), behind South Africa on 364.

Between 2008 and 2014, scientists from Botswana collaborated primarily with their peers from the United States of America, followed by South Africa, the UK, Canada and Germany, according to Thomson Reuters' Web of Science.

Information and communication technologies 
Botswana has a high-tech industry, and is home to a number of information technology companies. In 2020, Botswana's high-tech exports were worth about $16.2 million.

Since 2009, the Mascom company has established a network of rural community centres (Masco Kitsong Centres) which provide access to Internet and other digital services like mobile money, as well as computer training. By May 2018, there were 110 such centres in as many villages.

Mascom considers itself a public interest entity. In 2016, it launched the e-Schools Project which, by July 2019, had connected 623 government schools to Internet.

In 2020, Mascom provided Botswanans with free Internet access to the government’s Covid-19 tracker system. This government system was developed in collaboration with the United Nations Children’s Fund, the University of Oslo and other partners. The system was operational by 27 March 2020.

It comprises a case-based surveillance programme, a contact registration and follow-up programme, as well as a ports of entry screening and follow-up programme.

Legislation to improve cybersecurity was foreseen in the Eleventh National Development Plan. In 2018, parliament passed the Data Protection Act establishing the Information and Data Protection Commission. The act enshrines the right of citizens to access their personal data and to object to the processing of their personal data. However, as of March 2020, the commission had not yet been established, nor the law enforced.

Sustainable development 
In 2012, Botswana was one of ten African countries which adopted the Gaborone Declaration for Sustainability in Africa at the Summit for Sustainability in Africa. The signatories of this declaration recognize that GDP has its limitations as a measure of well-being and sustainable growth. They vow to integrate the value of natural capital into national accounting and corporate planning and reporting processes, policies and programmes.

In 2013, Botswana initiated the development of a National Climate Change Strategy and Action Plan. A climate change policy will be developed first, followed by the strategy. The process will reportedly be highly consultative, with the participation of rural inhabitants.

Botswana ratified the Paris Agreement on climate change on 11 November 2016. In 2016, the government drafted a Botswana Climate
Change Response Policy, with support from the United Nations Development Programme. It proposes developing a climate-focused research agenda, to guide academic curricula. A National Climate Change Unit is to be established to implement and monitor measures. A national climate change adaptation plan framework was awaiting formal endorsement in June 2020.

The SADC centre in Gaborone hosts the Regional Early Warning System, Famine Early Warning System and Climate Services Centre.

According to a UNESCO study of 56 research topics related to the Sustainable Development Goals, Botswanan output on invasive species has
surged from 1 (2012–2015) to 15 (2016–2019) publications. Researchers have been tackling the problem of the invasive water fern, Salvinia molesta, which has been threatening the Okavango Delta, a UNESCO World Heritage site and Africa’s largest wetland, for the past three decades. Thanks to the introduction of a Salvinia-munching weevil in 2002 as an alternative to chemical pesticides, the invasion was brought under control in 2016.

Regional policy framework for science and technology 
Botswana is one of only four SADC countries which had ratified the SADC Protocol on Science, Technology and Innovation (2008) by 2015. Ten of the 15 SADC countries must ratify the protocol for it to enter into force. The protocol promotes legal and political co-operation. It stresses the importance of science and technology for achieving 'sustainable and equitable socio-economic growth and poverty eradication'.

Two primary policy documents operationalize the SADC Treaty (1992), the Regional Indicative Strategic Development Plan for 2005–2020, adopted in 2003, and the Strategic Indicative Plan for the Organ (2004). The Regional Indicative Strategic Development Plan for 2005–2020 identifies the region's 12 priority areas for both sectorial and cross-cutting intervention, mapping out goals and setting up concrete targets for each. The four sectorial areas are: trade and economic liberalization, infrastructure, sustainable food security and human and social development. The eight cross-cutting areas are: 
 poverty;
 combating the HIV/AIDS pandemic;
 gender equality;
 science and technology;
 information and communication technologies (ICTs);
 environment and sustainable development;
 private sector development; and
 statistics.

Targets include:
 ensuring that 50% of decision-making positions in the public sector are held by women by 2015;
 raising gross domestic expenditure on research and development (GERD) to at least 1% of GDP by 2015;
 increasing intra-regional trade to at least 35% of total SADC trade by 2008 (10% in 2008);
 increasing the share of manufacturing to 25% of GDP by 2015; and
 achieving100% connectivity to the regional power grid for all member states by 2012.

A 2013 mid-term review of the Regional Indicative Strategic Development Plan for 2005–2020 noted that limited progress had been made towards STI targets, owing to the lack of human and financial resources at the SADC Secretariat to co-ordinate STI programmes. Meeting in Maputo, Mozambique, in June 2014, SADC ministers of science, technology and innovation, education and training adopted the SADC Regional Strategic Plan on Science, Technology and Innovation for 2015–2020 to guide implementation of regional programmes.

Concerning sustainable development, in 1999, the SADC adopted a protocol governing wildlife, forestry, shared water courses and the environment, including climate change, the SADC Protocol on Wildlife Conservation and Law Enforcement (1999). More recently, SADC has initiated a number of regional and national initiatives to mitigate the impact of climate change. In 2013, ministers responsible for the environment and natural resources approved the development of the SADC Regional Climate Change programme. In addition, COMESA, the East African Community and SADC have been implementing a joint five-year initiative since 2010 known as the Tripartite Programme on Climate Change Adaptation and Mitigation, or The African Solution to Address Climate Change.

See also 
 Botswana
 Economy of Botswana
 Commonwealth Telecommunications Organisation

Sources

References 

 
Economy of Botswana